Barkby Thorpe is a hamlet and civil parish in the Charnwood district of Leicestershire, England.  The hamlet has a population of around 50, and is close to the Leicester urban sprawl in Thurmaston. Nearby villages are Barkby,  Beeby and the abandoned village of Hamilton.

The name Barkby has an Old Norse origin meaning "Barki's farm/settlement".

References

Hamlets in Leicestershire
Civil parishes in Leicestershire
Borough of Charnwood